UDP-4-amino-4-deoxy-L-arabinose aminotransferase (UDP-(beta-L-threo-pentapyranosyl-4-ulose diphosphate) aminotransferase, UDP-4-amino-4-deoxy-L-arabinose---oxoglutarate aminotransferase, UDP-Ara4O aminotransferase, UDP-L-Ara4N transaminase) is an enzyme with systematic name UDP-4-amino-4-deoxy-beta-L-arabinose:2-oxoglutarate aminotransferase''. This enzyme catalyses the following chemical reaction

 UDP-4-amino-4-deoxy-beta-L-arabinopyranose + 2-oxoglutarate  UDP-beta-L-threo-pentapyranos-4-ulose + L-glutamate

This protein is a pyridoxal 5'-phosphate enzyme.

References

External links 
 

EC 2.6.1